Betty Thayer is a businesswoman whose career has focused on management consulting, the role of the non-executive director, corporate governance and transition post-retirement.

Life and career
Born in the United States, Thayer received her undergraduate degree in accounting from Elon University in North Carolina and her MBA from Vanderbilt University Owen Graduate School of Management. Following her graduation from Vanderbilt, she worked as management consulting partner at Ernst & Young. In 1991 she relocated to the UK where she was an Associate Partner at Andersen Consulting (Now Accenture). 

In 2001 Thayer founded the executive recruitment website exec-appointments.com and served as its CEO until its acquisition by the Financial Times in 2008. Since that time she has served as a non-executive board member or trustee for a number of UK organizations. Her views on corporate governance have been quoted in several publications including the BBC and The Daily Telegraph. She is a Liveryman of the Worshipful Company of Management Consultants.

Publications
Portfolio Working - Plural Careers Prove to Be a Singular Success, a survey by exec-appointments.com and Independent Direction Directors Advisory Service, 2003
50 Under 50 - Views from Chairs of the Future (with Ernst & Young UK), 2006
Why Does the Strategic Agenda Remain Elusive? (with Ernst & Young UK), 2007

References

External links

Executive Profile: Betty Thayer on Bloomberg. 

American businesspeople
British businesspeople
Vanderbilt University alumni
Living people
Year of birth missing (living people)